Genuang is a small town in Segamat District, Johor, Malaysia. The town is situated near Segamat.

Towns in Johor
Segamat District